Alberto López de Munain Ruiz de Gauna (born December 5, 1972) is a Spanish former professional road bicycle racer. He became professional in 1996 and ended his professional career in 2005. He rode his entire career for the  team.

During the 2005 Giro d'Italia, he suffered a terrible crash on stage two, and was diagnosed with a hydropneumothorax caused by nine broken ribs, a broken left clavicle, a broken shoulder blade and damage to his left shoulder. He did not race professionally afterwards.

Major results

1997
 8th Overall Euskal Bizikleta
1999
 6th Subida al Naranco
2000
 1st Prologue Critérium du Dauphiné Libéré
 2nd Overall Vuelta a Asturias
1st Stage 1
2001
 1st Stage 5 Vuelta a Asturias
 1st Stage 2 Clásica de Alcobendas
2003
 3rd Subida al Naranco
 3rd Subida a Urkiola
 10th Overall Critérium du Dauphiné Libéré
2004
 7th Overall Volta a Catalunya

Grand Tour general classification results timeline

References

1972 births
Living people
Spanish male cyclists
Cyclists from the Basque Country (autonomous community)
Sportspeople from Vitoria-Gasteiz